The Missa solemnis in C major by Wolfgang Amadeus Mozart, K. 337, was written in 1780 for Salzburg. It was Mozart's last complete mass. The mass is scored for soloists, choir, 2 oboes, 2 bassoons, 2 trumpets, 3 trombones, strings (without violas) and organ, the latter supplying figured bass for most of the duration.

Structure 
The setting is divided into six movements:

 Kyrie
 Gloria
 Credo
 Sanctus
 Benedictus
 Agnus Dei

The Sanctus recalls features of the Kyrie, and also has a violin figure Mozart used again in Idomeneo. The Benedictus is peculiar for Mozart's mass settings in that it is an austere fugue in an archaic style.

Fragmentary first Credo setting and its completion
The autograph of the mass features an alternative setting of the Credo. This setting has a length of 136 measures and abruptly ends after the words "cuius regni non erit finis". It is not clear why Mozart stopped work on this setting and instead began work on the second – and complete – setting of the Credo on the next page of the autograph, but this may be due to the fact that Mozart had forgotten to set the words "sub Pontio Pilato" to music in the first draft. In the years 1989 and 2003 Dr Murl Sickbert completed the fragment; in 2006 it was performed at Hardin–Simmons University, Texas.

Notes

References
 Green (2002) Jonathan D. New York A Conductor's Guide to Choral-Orchestral Works, Classical Period: Volume 1: Haydn and Mozart Scarecrow Press
 Heartz (1995) Daniel. New York. Haydn, Mozart, and the Viennese School: 1740 — 1780 W. W. Norton & Co.
 Hugues (1974) Rosemary. London. Haydn. J. M. Dent & Sons Ltd
 Schenbeck (1996) Lawrence. Chapel Hill, North Carolina Joseph Haydn and the Classical Choral Tradition Hinshaw Music

External links 

 
 

Masses by Wolfgang Amadeus Mozart
1780 compositions
Compositions in C major